The Swaziland Four Nations Tournament 2008 soccer finals were held from February 9 to February 10, 2008 at the Somhlolo National Stadium in Lobamba, Swaziland.
Swaziland, Botswana, Lesotho and Mozambique IX were the teams who played in this tournament. Malawi were originally due to take part, but withdrew at the last moment and Mozambique took their part. Mozambique played with an Invitational XI not their A team, therefore all their matches are unofficial.

Matches

Semi-finals

Third Place 

* (1-4 after penalty kicks).

Final

Winner

Scorers 

2 goals:
  Jerome Ramatlhakwane
  Moemedi Moatlhaping
1 goal:
  Pontsho Moloi
  Mauricio F. Nhamache
  Bushy Moletsane
  Thabo Motsweli
  Baiano Kunene
  Barry Steenkamp
  Tony Tsabedze

Swaziland
Football competitions in Eswatini
Foot